Wake of a Nation is the first extended play released avant-garde metal band Zeal & Ardor.

Background
Vocalist Manuel Gagneux wrote the songs in direct response to the murder of George Floyd earlier in 2020. Gagneux explained the EP in the announcement:

Artwork

The album artwork features two police batons in the shape of an inverted cross.artref

Composition
The album features elements of Black metal, soul, blackgaze, gothic rock, electronica, post-rock, and post-dubstep.

"Vigil" is a soul styled piano-driven track, featuring the lyrics "“I can’t breathe, it’s a cellphone, please don’t shoot". "Tuskegee" is about the Tuskegee Syphilis Study and is a black metal styled track.heavy blog "At The Seams" features piano and has been described as post-rock.

"I Can't Breathe", named after the dying words of Eric Garner, is an interlude that samples sounds from protests, news reports, and cellphone footage of black Americans being killed, over a "ominously bluesy" instrumental.singles "Trust No One" has been described as having "dynamic shifting between subdued passages and exuberant explosions" as the song changes between clean and unclean vocals.dansen The vocals on the song have been compared to those of blackgaze band Deafheaven. "Wake of a Nation" features chanting of "dies irae", Latin for "Day of Wrath".metalkorner.com

Track listing

Personnel
Zeal & Ardor
Manuel Gagneux - vocals, guitars, keyboards, art design
Marco von Allmen - drums
Marc Obrist - recording production

Production
Will Putney - mixing, mastering
Noé Herrmann - art design

References

External links

 Wake of a Nation at Bandcamp (streamed copy where licensed)

2020 EPs
Avant-garde metal albums
Zeal & Ardor albums
Black metal EPs